A pump track is a circuit of rollers, banked turns and features designed to be ridden completely by riders "pumping"—generating momentum by up and down body movements, instead of pedaling or pushing. It was originally designed for the mountain bike and BMX scene, and now, due to concrete constructions, is also used by skateboard, and accessible to wheelchairs. Pump tracks are relatively simple to use and cheap to construct, and cater to a wide variety of rider skill levels.

History 
Skateparks experienced a huge boom in the late 1990s and early 2000s. However, most of them were designed to be used by experienced or professional riders, and thus resulted in many injuries. Many communities looked for a better, more accessible solution. The first new era pump track in the United States was built in 2004 at The Fix Bike Shop in Boulder, Colorado, by professional downhill bicyclist Steve Wentz.

Track design 
Most pump tracks link a series of rollers to steeply bermed corners that bring the riders back around. They used to be built mostly out of dirt; recently companies have started to use concrete or asphalt. Paved pump tracks also have the advantage that they can be ridden by skateboarders, in-line skaters, and foot-powered scooters. The size can vary from 50m2 to over 8000m2.

Bikes 

Since momentum, or speed, is gained by the rider pumping, such as on the down-slope of each roller, the best bikes to use have no suspension, which would absorb useful energy. Bikes usually have a rigid frame, such as BMX-style bikes, which most efficiently convert the rider's motions into forward thrust. Some bikes have been designed which are custom built for a pump track, with features such as an offset crank, which stabilizes the pedals, and lowers the rider's center of gravity.

World Championship 
In 2018, Velosolutions teamed up with Red Bull and organized the pump track world championship. The world's best 67 riders from BMX and MTB raced at the world final in Arkansas. David Graf and Christa von Niederhäusern, both from Switzerland, were crowned the first ever Red Bull Pump Track World Champions. The series continued in 2019, with over 25 stops all around the world.
At the same time as the 2009 UCI World Mountain Bike Championships in Canberra, Australia an unsanctioned Pump Track World Championships was held, possibly the first ever.

See also 
 BMX
 Dirt jumping
 Glossary of cycling

External links

Notes and references 

Cycling infrastructure
Cycle sport
BMX